"Rappin' for Jesus" is a 2013 song, which has been viewed over 83 million times on YouTube as of March 2023. It was purportedly written for a Christian youth outreach program in Dubuque, Iowa, by Pastor Jim Colerick and his wife Mary Sue, but is generally thought to be a hoax or parody.

History
The original video was uploaded to YouTube by user Brian Spinney on February 5, 2013, and garnered wider attention through the website Reddit. Spinney claimed to have directed the video with his pastor while in high school.

Authenticity
The Daily Dot concluded the video is a hoax, calling it "obviously fake". Chris English, pastor of GracePoint Church in Dubuque, Iowa, said in 2013 that he had never heard of Pastor Jim Colerick or West Dubuque 2nd Church of Christ, the church supposedly affiliated with the song.

The website of West Dubuque 2nd Church of Christ, linked to by the original video, claims that the church closed in 2004. However, The Daily Dot pointed out that the website had been created on January 15, 2013, the same day as Spinney's YouTube channel. In light of this, The Huffington Post questioned the authenticity of the video, calling it "very peculiar indeed".

Criticism 
The song has the chorus line "Jesus Christ is my nigga". Pastor Chris English, in an email to The Christian Post, said the use of the word nigga was "clearly over the line, and offensive". He thought the video, parody or not, perpetuated many negative stereotypes about Christians, and as such, would have never worked in an outreach program for young people.

The Dallas Observer also criticized the song, saying: "it's cheesy. It's bad. It's painful." It described the song as having a negative impact on public perception of Christian rap.

References

External links 
 Rappin' for Jesus on YouTube archived at Ghostarchive.org on 11 April 2022

2013 songs
Internet memes introduced in 2013
Viral videos
Songs about Jesus
2013 YouTube videos
Christian hip hop songs
Musical parodies